Abruka Nature Reserve is a nature reserve which is located in Saare County, Estonia.

The area of the nature reserve is 414 ha.

The protected area was founded in 1937 to protect forests in Abruka. In 2007 the protected area was designated to the nature reserve.

References

Nature reserves in Estonia
Geography of Saare County